Echo is a census-designated place located in northwestern Summit County, Utah, United States. The population was 56 at the 2010 census.

Echo was founded in 1854. The community took its name from nearby Echo Canyon.

History
Echo originated as a stopover along the Mormon trail. Later the town served as a junction between the First transcontinental railroad and a spur line to serve silver mines near Park City. Since the creation of U.S. Highways Echo has served as a highway junction, where the main road coming from Wyoming splits with one branch proceeding towards Salt Lake City, continuing towards San Francisco, California, and the other towards Ogden, continuing to Portland, Oregon. Originally the main highway was numbered U.S. Route 30S and the branch was U.S. Route 530; the modern freeway equivalents are numbered Interstate 80 and Interstate 84.

Echo was significant to the Union Pacific Railroad. The town served as a coaling and watering station for trains entering Echo Canyon. From Echo, helper locomotives were added, when needed, to push trains up the steep grade to Wahsatch. A large coaling tower and many other railroad infrastructures existed in and around the town. Echo saw the most action during World War II.

The introduction of diesel power, especially after the war, negated the need for the services previously required by steam. The coaling tower, most trackage, and structures were removed.

Echo had faded by the sixties, yet was still alive by the junction of two major highways. However, the arrival of the interstate relegated the town to a few quaint buildings; some homes, a motel, restaurant and bus station. A tavern sells cigarettes, food, and beer. Nearby; Echo Canyon is a magnificent spectacle with its high rock sides and colorful scenery. The canyon begins just east of Echo and ends outside of Wahsatch, Utah.

Demographics
As of the census of 2010, there were 56 people living in the CDP. There were 31 housing units. The racial makeup of the town was 96.4% White and 3.6% American Indian and Alaska Native. Hispanic or Latino of any race were 19.6% of the population.

Education
It is in the North Summit School District.

Climate
Echo has a continental climate (Köppen Dfb) characterized by cold, snowy winters and hot summers with high diurnal temperature variation.

See also

 List of census-designated places in Utah
 National Register of Historic Places listings in Summit County, Utah

References

Populated places established in 1854
Census-designated places in Summit County, Utah
Census-designated places in Utah
1854 establishments in Utah Territory